This article lists the winners and nominees for the Black Reel Award for Outstanding Ensemble. First given in 2006, this award is given to the casting directors. Victoria Thomas holds the record for most wins in this category with 3.

Winners and nominees
Winners are listed first and highlighted in bold.

2000s

2010s

2020s

Multiple nominations and wins

Multiple wins
 3 Wins
 Victoria Thomas

 2 Wins
 Sarah Finn 
 Kim Hardin 
 Billy Hopkins
 Victoria Thomas

Multiple nominations

 9 Nominations
 Victoria Thomas

 7 Nominations
 Kim Coleman

 5 Nominations
 Mary Vernieu 
 Kim Hardin

 3 Nominations
 Twinkie Byrd
 Francine Maisler 
 Cindy Tolan 
 Billy Hopkins 
 Aisha Coley 
 Avy Kaufman

 2 Nominations
 Tiffany Little Canfield 
 Terri Taylor 
 Sarah Finn
 Paul Schnee
 Michelle Wade Byrd
 Lisa Mae Fincannon
 Lindsay Graham 
 Kerry Barden
 Craig Fincannon 
 Bernard Telsey

References

Black Reel Awards
Film awards for Best Cast